On 17 February 2008, the majority of members of the Assembly of Kosovo, including Hashim Thaçi, and Fatmir Sejdiu (who were not members of the Assembly), not acting in the capacity of PISG, declared Kosovo an independent and sovereign state. Kosovo was soon recognized as a sovereign state by the United States, Turkey, Albania, Austria, Germany, Italy, France, the United Kingdom, the Republic of China (Taiwan), and others. This triggered an international debate over whether Kosovo's unilateral declaration of independence had set a precedent in international law that could apply to other separatist movements, or whether it is a special case. The recognition of Kosovo's independence by 101 out of  UN states, according to many sources, has given fresh impetus to other separatist movements.

There is an estimation that a group of 70 unrecognized nations and organizations use the Kosovo precedent to achieve their goals. Abkhazia and South Ossetia renewed their calls for the recognition of their sovereignty. Kosovo's independence also led to increased tensions in Bosnia and Herzegovina, where the Republika Srpska vetoed recognising Kosovo, and threatened to declare independence themselves.

The precedent was cited over the course of the Russo-Ukrainian War. Russian President Vladimir Putin refused to recognize Kosovo independence, but subsequently used the precedent to achieve goals in Ukraine. The Republic of Crimea proclaimed its independence from Ukraine on 11 March 2014, citing the Kosovo precedent; Crimea was annexed by the Russian Federation just a week later. In 2022, recognition of eastern Ukraine's breakaway regions and their later annexation by Putin's government were also done under the pretext of Kosovo precedent.

Arguments

Kosovo does not establish a precedent

Some leaders argue that the Kosovo situation is unique and does not establish a precedent.

In a statement issued 19 February 2008 the U.S. State Department argued every territorial conflict is unique. It said Kosovo's unilateral independence cannot be used by other states to resolve disputes. When asked about the Kosovo's independence in reference to recognition of South Ossetia, Secretary of State Condoleezza Rice dismissed it and said, "we've been very clear that Kosovo is sui generis and that that is because of the special circumstances out of which the breakup of Yugoslavia came.  The special circumstances of the aggression of the Milosevic forces against Kosovars, particularly Albanian Kosovars, and it’s a special circumstance." Rice additionally referred to UN sanctions on the then-Federal Republic of Yugoslavia and the presence of UNMIK as reasons for Kosovo being a special case.

Secretary-General of the United Nations Ban Ki-Moon in an interview for Interfax news agency said "Each situation needs to be examined based on its unique circumstances," and said Kosovo was a "highly distinctive situation" because of the intervention of the international community.  At the same time he emphasised that recognition is left up to UN member states and is not decided by the Secretariat or the Secretary-General.

Kosovo establishes a useful precedent

Some argue that Kosovo establishes a precedent for other geographical regions that wish to secede.

Daniel Turp, a member of the pro-Quebec sovereignty Parti Québécois who sits in the National Assembly of Quebec, said "Recognition [of Kosovo] sets the stage for Ottawa to eventually recognize an independent Quebec"
László Tőkés, an ethnic Hungarian from Romania who is a member of the European Parliament for Hungary, said Kosovo is a "model for the Romanian region of Transylvania".
Igor Smirnov, the leader of Transnistria, a predominantly Russian and Ukrainian separatist republic in what is internationally recognised to be eastern Moldova, said "For us, the Kosovo precedent is an important ... factor."

Kosovo establishes a dangerous precedent
A number of political leaders have voiced their belief that the independence of Kosovo will create a dangerous precedent for other separatist movements.

Russian President Vladimir Putin described the declaration of independence by Kosovo as a "terrible precedent that will come back to hit the West in the face". Russian Defence Minister Sergei Ivanov and Russian diplomat Konstantin Kosachev said that granting Kosovo independence would open Pandora's box.
Argentine Foreign Minister Jorge Taiana: "Recognizing Kosovo's independence ... would set a dangerous precedent against the national claim to recover sovereignty over the Malvinas islands."
The Sri Lankan foreign ministry said Kosovo "could set an unmanageable precedent in the conduct of international relations, the established global order of sovereign states and could thus pose a grave threat to international peace and security."
Czech Republic President Václav Klaus: "For me Kosovo is, above all, a precedent. We’ve opened a Pandora’s Box in Europe that could have disastrous consequences."
The Indian Ambassador to Serbia Ajay Swarup: Kosovo "can set a very dangerous precedent for similar cases around the world".
President Amadou Toumani Touré of Mali: "International norms must be respected because their abuse and the violation of territorial integrity could threaten a series of countries with a similar problem."
Slovakian Prime Minister Robert Fico: Kosovo may become a dangerous precedent to be followed by separatists in other regions.
Tajikistan Foreign Minister Asomudin Saidov: "This precedent may result in other peoples also demanding territorial independence."
Vietnam's Ambassador to the United Nations Le Luong Minh: "By creating a dangerous precedent, this development has negative implications for international peace and stability,"

To minimise a serious influence of Kosovo Precedent to the solution of other conflicts, the OSCE Parliamentary Assembly held in Kyiv in July 2007 issued a warning that "solution of certain conflicts should not be used as a model for the solution of other conflicts".

Position of the Russian Federation

Russian President Vladimir Putin stated in 2008:"Our position is extremely clear. Any resolution on Kosovo should be approved by both sides. It is also clear that any resolution on Kosovo will definitely set a precedent in international practice." Analysts have taken this as meaning the Russian Federation would come out for the independence of de facto independent breakaway regions in the former Soviet Union.

Sergei Mironov, the chairman of Russia's upper house of parliament stated in December 2007, "In case of the unilateral recognition of the independence of Kosovo, Russia will be entitled to change its approach to the so-called unrecognised republics in the post-soviet regions - South Ossetia, Abkhazia and Transnistria". He went on to state "In case of such a recognition of Kosovo, Russia will be able to say that it is free in its approach, including towards the so-called unrecognised republics of Abkhazia, South Ossetia, the Nagorno-Karabakh Republic and Transnistria".

Immediately following Kosovo's declaration of independence the Russian officials appeared to soften their position, with Boris Gryzlov stating only that Moscow should "reshape its relations with self-proclaimed republics" which according to news reports could mean lifting the economic embargo on the regions.

On 13 March 2008, following a hearing on the unrecognised republics, the Russian Duma Committee for CIS  recommended an upgrading of relations with Abkhazia, Transnistria, the Nagorno-Karabakh Republic and South Ossetia - including the possibility of recognition. Other recommendations included or reported include:

 the establishment of diplomatic missions in the regions, with the foreign ministry to decide whether they are consulates or another type of mission
 a removal of import duties on goods created by businesses with Russian shareholders in the regions
 increased humanitarian and economic assistance for Russian passport-holders in the regions

Alexei Ostrovsky, chairman of the lower house's committee on former Soviet affairs said at the parliamentary hearing, "The world community should understand that from now on the resolution of conflicts in the ex-Soviet area cannot be seen in any other context from that of Kosovo." Participation of the breakaway republics in international organisations and forums was also mentioned in a press release before the hearings. The Nezavisimaya Gazeta daily described the hearing as "the launch of a procedure of recognition". The committee recommendations were set to go to a vote a week after the hearing. Russian Deputy Foreign Minister Grigory Karasin said the ministry would "look carefully at all the recommendations" but that Russian policy remained unchanged.

Russian Foreign Minister Sergey Lavrov stated in 2008: "A precedent is objectively created not just for South Ossetia and Abkhazia but also for an estimated 200 territories around the world. If someone is allowed to do something, many others will expect similar treatment." Chairman of Foreign Affairs Committee Mikhail Margelov said the precedent set by Kosovo "will inspire separatists not only in Europe, but in the Middle East as well."

Alleged influence of events

Russo-Ukrainian War 

 
In 2014, Russia recognized Crimean independence, but not that of Kosovo. Later, in February 2022 Vladimir Putin, President of Russia has cited Kosovo precedent as justification for Russian recognition of the Donetsk People's Republic and the Luhansk People's Republic.

Chris Borgen, Professor of Law and Co-Director of the Center for International and Comparative Law at St. John's University School of Law in New York City, disagreed with Kremlin's evocation of Kosovo. He stated that Kosovo was under international administration for over a decade, and was the place of ethnic crimes in a bloody conflict; conversely, no such events engulfed Crimea before 2014. Furthermore, Kosovo remained independent, whereas Crimea was annexed by Russia, indicating that the real motivation of the latter was Russian irredentism.

In October 2017, Czech president Miloš Zeman called the international community's recognition of Kosovo independence and protest over Crimean annexation as 'double standards'.

Georgia, Abkhazia and South Ossetia
 

EU High Representative for Common Foreign and Security Policy Javier Solana has expressed concern that Kosovo's campaign for independence could set a precedent for Georgia's breakaway regions of South Ossetia and Abkhazia. On 6 March 2008 Russia's Foreign Ministry announced it had lifted sanctions on Abkhazia and called on other CIS member states to do the same. Russia denied the event had any connection to Kosovo, but Georgian parliament speaker Nino Burjanadze said she believed the move was part of Russia's response to Kosovo's declaration and signals an attempt to "annex" Abkhazia.

Eduard Kokoity, the President of South Ossetia's breakaway republic, speaking immediately after Kosovo's secession said, "Some countries will recognise our republics [South Ossetia and Abkhazia]. I cannot rule out that some of them may do so later this year. Russia, however, will not necessarily be the first to recognise our independence." South Ossetia, Abkhazia, and Transnistria have all submitted formal requests for recognition of their independence to Russia, among other countries, and international organisations citing Kosovo as a precedent.

Abkhazia's Sergei Bagapsh and South Ossetia's Eduard Kokoity said in a statement addressed to the United Nations: "If Kosovo is separated from Serbia and its independence is recognised, one more powerful proof will emerge that ethnic conflicts can be solved on principles other than a respect for territorial integrity ... Abkhazia and South Ossetia have just as strong grounds to demand independence as Kosovo." Separately, Sergey Bagapsh said "The fate of Kosovo has been ordained, thus our fate will also be determined in the nearest future."

In October 2009, Russian President Dmitry Medvedev said that parallels between Kosovo and South Ossetia are inappropriate. Medvedev said that in case of South Ossetia it was about repelling a military aggression and condemned the unilateral actions and recognition of Kosovo.

Armenia, Azerbaijan, Artsakh

Armenia's Deputy Parliament Speaker Vahan Hovhannisyan has said Kosovo's independence will influence the settlement of the dispute over Artsakh Republic. Foreign Minister Vardan Oskanyan declared at the UN General Assembly session in October 2007 that the Armenian side “does not understand and cannot accept the reverse logic that Kosovo was given independence and that another nation cannot obtain self-determination." Before being elected president, Armenian prime-minister Serzh Sargsyan said Kosovo was not a precedent for Karabakh. He underlined that Nagorno-Karabakh has been independent for the past 17 years. However, former President of Armenia Robert Kocharyan said "The Kosovo precedent is too important for Armenia. Certainly, this will have a positive influence for recognition of independence of Nagorno Karabakh Republic".

An Azerbaijan Foreign Ministry spokesman has said of Kosovo: "We view this illegal act as being in contradiction with international law."
Following a skirmish between Armenian military forces in Nagorno-Karabakh and Azerbaijan forces which left 4 Azeri and 12 Armenian soldiers dead, Azerbaijan said it was sparked by international recognition of Kosovo. US State Department Spokesman Tom Casey rejected the comparison stating "Kosovo is not a precedent and should [not] be seen as a precedent for any other place out there in the world. It certainly isn't a precedent for Nagorno-Karabakh."

Moldova and Transnistria

The then president of the unrecognised state of Transnistria Igor Smirnov said that "the Russian leadership, in recognising the independence of Abkhazia and South Ossetia, has underlined the priority of the expression of the wills of the people for solving such problems".

On 27 August, the day after Russia's recognition, Dmitry Medvedev met with President of Moldova Vladimir Voronin, where the Russian leader made clear that Moscow is ready to make the maximal efforts to solve the Transnistria conflict in the framework of the sovereignty of the Republic of Moldova. Relations between Moldova and Transnistria worsened after Moldova refused to support the independence of Abkhazia and South Ossetia, which Chișinău categorically rejected, considering that "as in the case of the recognition of Kosovo, this step only decreases amenability of the sides in the search for a compromise".

Republika Srpska
 

According to a poll of Bosnian Serbs taken by the Brussels-based Gallup Balkan Monitor in November 2010, 87 percent would support a referendum being called on Republika Srpska's independence from Bosnia and Herzegovina.

Since Kosovo's declaration of independence Bosnian Serb nationalists have called for Dodik to fulfill his promises and call a referendum. Dodik has since said he will only call a referendum if Srpska's autonomy is threatened. Despite this Bosnian Serb lawmakers passed a resolution on February 21, 2008, calling for a referendum on independence if a majority of the UN members (98 out of 193), especially members of the European Union, recognise Kosovo's declaration of independence. After the resolution was passed the U.S. cut aid to the SNSD and the resolution was condemned by the European Union. The Peace Implementation Council (PIC) overseeing Bosnia and Herzegovina said the country's entities have no right to secede. The High Representative for Bosnia and Herzegovina, Miroslav Lajcak said Srpska has "absolutely no right" to secede and that he would use his Bonn Powers "if there are threats to peace and stability" or the Dayton peace agreement.

In an interview, Dodik said if most countries recognise Kosovo's self-proclaimed independence, this would legitimise the right to secession and added "we do not see a single reason why we should not be granted the right to self-determination, the right envisaged in international conventions."

Montenegro

Members of the majority in the municipal assembly of Pljevlja in Montenegro announced a secession from Montenegro following the Montenegrin recognition of Kosovo.

Northern Cyprus

Özdil Nami, a senior Turkish Cypriot official, told the Turkish Daily News, "When diplomatic efforts are exhausted other alternatives are put on the table. We clearly see this in Kosovo where diplomacy proved futile and other formulas are floating around. This will certainly have an impact on Cyprus." Nami suggests the resolution of Kosovo may be applied to North Cyprus well. According to Nami, "Everyone sees 2008 as the last window of opportunity for a solution to the Cyprus problem." He claims Cyprus is being warned that "other alternatives could be on the agenda" if there is no resolution. Turkish Cypriot leader Mehmet Ali Talat has rejected this connection saying "We do not see a direct link between the situation in Kosovo and the Cyprus Problem. These problems have come up through different conditions."

Slovakia 
In Slovakia the Kosovo precedent is seen as a potential threat to its territorial integrity because of the worsened relations with the ethnic Hungarians that live on the south of the country.

Israel

On 20 February 2008, days following Kosovo's declaration of independence, it was widely interpreted in Israel, from Yasser Abed Rabos comments, that Palestine may follow suit with a declaration of its own. Israel has criticized states that have recognized Palestine but refuse to recognize Kosovo, and stated that Israel will not recognize Kosovo until all European states do so. However, in September 2020, Israel did recognize Kosovo.

Spain, Catalonia

North Kosovo

 
Since the independence declaration, the Serb-inhabited North Kosovo, through its municipalities and subsequently the Assembly of the Community of Municipalities, was de facto independent during the North Kosovo crisis, until the Brussels Agreement (2013). In 2012, a referendum saw 99.74% of voters reject the Republic of Kosovo. A planned Community of Serb Municipalities is set to be formed.

See also

 Colour revolution
 Controversy over Abkhazian and South Ossetian independence
 Detachment (territory)
 Greater Albania
 Independence referendum
 Irredentism
 Kosovo status process
 Nationalism
 Right to exist
 Yugoslav Wars

References

Further reading
Jia, Bing Bing. "The independence of Kosovo: A unique case of secession?." Chinese Journal of International Law 8.1 (2009): 27–46.
Allin, Dana H. "Unintended consequences–managing Kosovo independence." What Status for Kosovo (2001): 7-17.
Charney, Jonathan I. "Self-Determination: Chechnya, Kosovo, and East Timor." Vand. J. Transnatl. L. 34 (2001): 455.
Nevo, Zohar, and Tamar Megiddo. "Lessons From Kosovo: The Law of Statehood and Palestinian Unilateral Independence." J. Int'l L & Int'l Rel. 5 (2009): 89.
Faulconbridge, Guy, March MOSCOW, and South Ossetia. "Georgia rebel region seeks recognition after Kosovo." Reuters (2008).
Müllerson, Rein. "Precedents in the mountains: on the parallels and uniqueness of the cases of Kosovo, South Ossetia and Abkhazia." Chinese Journal of International Law 8.1 (2009): 2-25.
Berg, Eiki. "Re-examining sovereignty claims in changing territorialities: reflections from ‘Kosovo Syndrome’." Geopolitics 14.2 (2009): 219-234.
McNamara, Sally. "Russia’s Recognition of Independence for South Ossetia and Abkhazia Is Illegitimate: They Are Not Kosovo." Heritage Foundation WebMemo 2037 (2008): 28.
Summers, James, ed. Kosovo: A Precedent?: The Declaration of Independence, the Advisory Opinion and Implications for Statehood, Self-Determination and Minority Rights. Brill, 2011.
Borgen, Christopher J. "From Kosovo to Catalonia: Separatism and Integration in Europe." Goettingen J. Int'l L. 2 (2010): 997.

External links

How will Kosovo affect global politics? Ynetnews
Sovereign Kosovo raises questions for Hungarian minority -- Canadian Hungarian Journal
The Kosovo precedent in the making Turkish Daily News
Breakaway regions look to Kosovo precedent Reuters
Serbia warns of a new Balkan war as peace talks over Kosovo fail The Times
Messy Kosovo breakaway stokes fear of partition Reuters
Tensions mount by the shores of the Black Sea The Globe and Mail
The Kosovo Crisis in an International Law Perspective: Self-determination, Territorial Integrity and the NATO Intervention

Aftermath of the Cold War
Conflict of laws
Diplomatic recognition
Geopolitics
Precedent
International law legal terminology
International relations theory
National questions
Partition (politics)
Political theories
Abkhazia
Crimea
Cyprus
Georgia
Moldova
Nagorno-Karabakh
North Cyprus
Republika Srpska
Serbia
South Ossetia
Ukraine
Secession
Separatism